District 11 (often referenced with the Roman Numerals District XI) of the Pennsylvania Interscholastic Athletic Association (PIAA) is an interscholastic athletic association in eastern Pennsylvania.

District XI is one of the PIAA's 12 districts and comprises high schools mostly within the Lehigh Valley and a few surrounding counties.

The district is broadly considered one of the most competitive high school athletic divisions in the nation with many of its athletes going on to compete in the Olympics and professional sports, including the MLB, NBA, and NFL. District 11 owns many state records for various athletic championships and milestones.

Member schools are categorized by enrollment into classifications, differing in each of the various sports, including: A, AA, AAA, AAAA, AAAAA, and AAAAAA.

Member schools
District 11 is made up of 53 public schools and private schools located in Carbon, Lehigh, Monroe, Northampton, Schuylkill, and parts of Bucks and Pike counties. The district's largest schools compete in the Eastern Pennsylvania Conference with the remaining schools competing in the Colonial League and Schuylkill League.

Listing of schools by league

Eastern Pennsylvania Conference
 Allentown Central Catholic
 Bethlehem Catholic
 Dieruff (Allentown)
 Easton
 East Stroudsburg North
 East Stroudsburg South
 Emmaus
 Freedom (Bethlehem)
 Liberty (Bethlehem)
 Nazareth
 Northampton
 Parkland
 Pleasant Valley
 Pocono Mountain East
 Pocono Mountain West
 Stroudsburg
 Whitehall
 William Allen (Allentown)

Colonial League
 Bangor
 Catasauqua
 Moravian Academy
 Northern Lehigh
 Northwestern Lehigh
 Notre Dame
 Palisades
 Palmerton
 Pen Argyl
 Salisbury
 Saucon Valley
 Southern Lehigh
 Wilson

Schuylkill League
 Blue Mountain
 Jim Thorpe
 Lehighton
 Mahanoy
 Marian Catholic
 Minersville
 Nativity BVM
 North Schuylkill
 Panther Valley
 Pine Grove
 Pottsville
 Schuylkill Haven
 Shenandoah Valley
 Tamaqua
 Tri-Valley
 Weatherly
 Williams Valley

Atlantic Coast Christian Athletic Conference
 Salem Christian School

No League
 Building 21 High School
 Executive Education Charter School
 Gillingham Charter School
 Lincoln Leadership Academy Charter School
 Notre Dame (East Stroudsburg)

Although it is named the Schuylkill League, teams from Carbon, Columbia, and Dauphin counties are included.

Although parts of Hazleton Area School District are in Schuylkill and Carbon counties, they participate with Luzerne County in District 2.

Sports
District 11 hosts 14 different sports over the three athletic seasons: 

Fall: Football, soccer, field hockey, tennis (girls), volleyball (girls), golf, and cross country

Winter: Swimming and diving, wrestling, basketball, and competitive spirit

Spring: Tennis (boys), softball, baseball, volleyball (boys), track and field, and lacrosse

See also
 Colonial League
 Eastern Pennsylvania Conference
 PIAA football records

References

External links
 Official website
 PIAA District 11 sports news at The Morning Call

High school sports in Pennsylvania
Pennsylvania high school sports conferences
Pennsylvania Interscholastic Athletic Association
Bucks County, Pennsylvania
Carbon County, Pennsylvania
Lehigh County, Pennsylvania
Monroe County, Pennsylvania
Northampton County, Pennsylvania
Pike County, Pennsylvania
Schuylkill County, Pennsylvania